Glenea shuteae is a species of beetles from the family Cerambycidae. The scientific name of this species was first published in 2011 by Lin & Yang.

References

shuteae
Beetles described in 2011